Odisea (Spanish) or Odisseia (Portuguese) is a documentary cable channel available in Spain and Portugal, with feeds in Portuguese or Spanish. It split into versions, and the Portuguese channel Odisseia became also available in Angola, Mozambique and Cape Verde.

Owned by AMC Networks International Iberia, Odisea was founded in 1996, and was one of the first ever Iberian cable channels. It presents various documentaries by BBC and Granada Television.

Odisea merged its output with that of its competitor Documania.

See also 

Canal Hollywood
AMC Networks International Iberia
Canal Panda

External links 
Odisea-Odisseia site
Odisseia at LyngSat Address

AMC Networks International
Television stations in Spain
Television channels and stations established in 1996